Jonathan Clark is a British reality television personality and builder from Essex, who first rose to fame in 2015 by appearing on the ITV2 reality series Love Island where he came runner-up with fellow contestant Hannah Elizabeth. In 2016, he joined the cast of The Only Way Is Essex with his brother Chris Clark.

Career
On 2 June 2015 it was announced that Jon would be starring in the revival series of Love Island. Shortly after joining the show he was coupled up with playboy bunny Hannah Elizabeth, where they came runner-up during the final on 15 July 2015. In February 2016, Jon joined the cast of semi-reality television programme The Only Way is Essex for the seventeenth series along with his brother Chris. and has remained part of the cast since.

Filmography

References

Year of birth missing (living people)
Living people
Love Island (2015 TV series) contestants